Louis Marcus may refer to:
Louis Marcus (mayor) (1880–1936), former mayor of Salt Lake City
Louis Marcus (filmmaker) (born 1936), Irish documentarian